Niemierzyn Valley (Polish: Dolina Niemierzyńska; German until 1945: Nemitzer Talgrund, Nemitzer Tal-Grund) is a valley in central western part of city of Szczecin, Poland.

Characteristics 
The valley is located next to Osówka stream. On the valley are located: Jan Kasprowicz Park, Stefan Kownas Arboretum and part of the Arkoński Forest Park as well as neighbourhoods of Niemierzyn and part of Niebuszewo. Peat soils dominate the area.

History 
In the end of 16th century a sheep farm was probably located in the norther part of the valley, most probably being established by Eckelberg family.

References 

Valleys of Poland
Szczecin
Landforms of West Pomeranian Voivodeship